The Kestrel Institute is a nonprofit computer science research center located in Palo Alto's Stanford Research Park. Cordell Green, who founded Kestrel in 1981, is its Director and Chief Scientist. Its mission is to make it easier to write good, high-quality software and employs computer scientists like Lambert Meertens.

In the 1980s, Kestrel described its research focus as "knowledge-based software environments" to make it easier to write software ("normalize and mechanize the programming process"). In addition, a 2002 MIT Technology Review article described one of Kestrel's projects as a way to "almost force coders to write reliable programs". A 2005 Newsweek article discussed one Kestrel technology that developed software to help the U.S. military schedule cargo deployment by "translating a description of a problem into guidelines a computer can understand".

Nearly all of Kestrel's funding comes from government grants, from organizations such as the U.S. Department of Defense, DARPA, Intelligence Advanced Research Projects Activity (IARPA), Air Force Research Laboratory (AFRL), AFOSR, Office of Naval Research (ONR), NASA, and the National Science Foundation (NSF). In 2015 it received $4.9 million in grants and contributions, down from the previous year's $6.6 million.

References

External links

Computer science organizations
Computer science research organizations
Artificial intelligence associations
Science and technology think tanks
Organizations based in Palo Alto, California